The following lists events that happened during 2000 in Germany.

Incumbents

Federal level
President – Johannes Rau
Chancellor – Gerhard Schröder

Events
 9–20 February - 50th Berlin International Film Festival
 18 February - Germany in the Eurovision Song Contest 2000
 27 February - Schleswig-Holstein state election, 2000
 14 May - North Rhine-Westphalia state election, 2000
 25 July – Air France Flight 4590 crashes near Paris, France shortly after taking off, killing 109 people mostly Germans, and 4 on the ground.
 2 October - German company ProSiebenSat.1 Media was founded.
 Date unknown: German company Mannesmann is taken over by British company Vodafone.
 Date unknown:  Fusion of German company VEBA and German company  to German company E.ON

Popular culture

Sport

Births

 26 September - Akim Camara, violinist child prodigy
 1 December - Sophia Flörsch, racing driver

Deaths

 4 January - Diether Krebs, German actor and comedian (born 1947)
 7 January - Klaus Wennemann, German actor (born 1940)
 8 January - Fritz Thiedemann, German equestrian (born 1918)
 11 March - Alfred Schwarzmann, German gymnast (born 1912)
 17 March - Harry Blum, German politician (born 1944)
 10 April — Walter Stöhrer, German painter (born 1937)
 21 May - Erich Mielke, German politician (born 1907)
 22 May - Ernst-Dieter Lueg, journalist (born 1930)
 21 August - Gustav Scholz, German boxer (born 1930)
 2 October - Harald Wust, German general (born 1921)
 20 October - Klaus Winter, German judge (born 1936)
 15 October – Konrad Emil Bloch, biochemist (born 1912)
 21 November  Harald Leipnitz, German actor (born 1926)
 12 December - Götz Friedrich, German opera and theatre director. (born 1930)
 13 December -Erhard Krack, German politician (born 1931)
 27 December - Mark Brandis (Nikolai von Michalewsky), journalist and science fiction author (born 1931)

See also
2000 in German television

References

 
Years of the 20th century in Germany
2000s in Germany
Germany
Germany